Gymnothorax visakhaensis is a species of fish native to India. This long, brown fish has a dull snout and 163-169 vertebrae.

References 

Fish described in 2017